İhsan Tav (1878 – 7 August 1941) was a Turkish jurist and antisemitic politician.

Biography
He graduated from Istanbul University, Faculty of Law. He was the head of the Administrative Council of the period. He was married and had three children.

References

1878 births
1941 deaths
Istanbul University Faculty of Law alumni
People from Ordu
Place of death missing
Republican People's Party (Turkey) politicians
Members of the Grand National Assembly of Turkey